Valentin Vladimirovich Nikolayev (6 April 1924 – 31 October 2004) was a Soviet Greco-Roman wrestler. He won the world title in 1955 and an Olympic gold medal in 1956. He also won gold medals at the World Festival of Youth and Students in 1951, 1953 and 1955. Domestically he held the Soviet light-heavyweight title in 1951 and 1954, placing second in 1953.

Nikolayev took up wrestling in 1945 and until 1956 competed as a light-heavyweight, before moving to a heavier class and winning three silver medals at the Soviet championships in 1957–59. He retired in 1960 and then had a long career as a coach in Rostov-on-Don, where he spent most of his life.

Nikolayev graduated from the Rostov Transport University. He was married to Nelli and had a daughter Stella and a son Vladimir.

References

External links
 

1924 births
2004 deaths
Soviet male sport wrestlers
Olympic wrestlers of the Soviet Union
Wrestlers at the 1956 Summer Olympics
Ukrainian male sport wrestlers
Olympic gold medalists for the Soviet Union
Olympic medalists in wrestling
Medalists at the 1956 Summer Olympics
Sportspeople from Kirovohrad Oblast